Kalpa or Kalpas may refer to:

KalPa, a Finnish men's ice hockey team
KalPa Naiset, a Finnish women's ice hockey team
Kalpa (time) a Sanskrit word referring to a great length of time (Aeon)
Kalpa (Vedanga), meaning "proper practice" or "ritual", one of the six disciplines of Vedanga in Hinduism
Kalpa, Himachal Pradesh, India
Kalpas (river), a river of Asia Minor

See also
Kalp (disambiguation)